This is the list of presidents of Poitou-Charentes since 1974. Regional legislatures are directly elected since 1986.

Politics of Poitou-Charentes
Lists of French politicians